The 2012 R League is the reserve association football league of 2012 K-League. 2012 season was held from March 29 to September 10. In this season, Police FC and eleven K-League club's reserves participate the league. Five reserve clubs (Chunnam, Daegu, Daejeon, Jeju, Jeonbuk) did not participate this season. Group League A teams will play 15 games each and Group League B teams will play 12 games each.

League standing

Group League A (GLA)

Group League B (GLB)

Winners

External links
 K League website

R League seasons
2012 in South Korean football